The Whittlesey House is a historic house in the Huning Highlands neighborhood of Albuquerque, New Mexico. It was built in 1903 by architect Charles Frederick Whittlesey, who briefly lived there with his family, and currently houses the Albuquerque Press Club. The building is a rustic, three-story log and stone structure based on Norwegian Vernacular architecture, which is highly unusual for New Mexico.

It was added to the New Mexico State Register of Cultural Properties in 1975 and was listed on the National Register of Historic Places as a contributing property in the Huning Highlands Historic District in 1978. In 1979, it was designated an Albuquerque city landmark.

History
The house was designed and built by Charles Frederick Whittlesey, who was in Albuquerque working on the Alvarado Hotel. It was originally intended to be a communal residence for the clerks and draftsmen at his architectural office and was named "Bungalow Barracks" with this in mind. Describing the planned house in 1902, the Albuquerque Journal wrote

Whittlesey bought land for the project at the edge of the city, near the high point of the Huning Highlands neighborhood, in December, 1902. By the following July, the house was reported to be nearly finished. The house was of log construction and built in the style of a Norwegian villa. Whittlesey briefly lived there with his family, but was frequently away supervising construction of various projects. By 1908, he had sold the property and was living in California.

From 1920 to 1960, the house was the residence of Clifford Hall McCallum, a business owner and socialite who entertained prominent guests including William Randolph Lovelace II, Clinton Anderson, and Clyde Tingley there. She also converted the stable and parts of the house into rental units for extra income. In 1960, Lambda Chi Alpha purchased the building for use as a fraternity house. Since 1973, it has housed the Albuquerque Press Club, a private social club originally catering to local journalists.

Architecture
The Whittlesey House is a three-story, split-level log building on a stone foundation. The main part of the house is two stories with a wide Dutch gable roof, while the rear wing extends to three stories. Susan DeWitt described the building as "an enormously sophisticated log cabin". Whittlesey based the design on a Norwegian villa, with many rustic details. The Albuquerque Journal wrote in 1903:

According to an Albuquerque Journal article from 1994,

References

Landmarks in Albuquerque, New Mexico
Houses in Albuquerque, New Mexico
New Mexico State Register of Cultural Properties
Houses completed in 1903